"Just One Fix" is the third single from industrial metal band Ministry's 1992 album Psalm 69: The Way to Succeed and the Way to Suck Eggs. The song features samples from Sid and Nancy, Hellbound: Hellraiser II and Frank Sinatra reciting "Just One Fix" (from the movie The Man with the Golden Arm).

The video, directed by Peter Christopherson of the band Coil, features footage  of one of Al Jourgensen's influences, author William S. Burroughs. Burroughs also provided the single's cover art.

"Just One Fix" was covered by thrash metal band Sepultura on the album Kairos.

In March 2023, Rolling Stone ranked "Just One Fix", at number 49 on their "100 Greatest Heavy Metal Songs of All Time" list.

Sampling
The song samples Peter Fonda and Bruce Dern’s dialogue about thorazine from the Roger Corman film The Trip, Chloe Webb’s statement on trust from Sid and Nancy and a sample of an hysterical plea for a fix from the jailhouse scene in Otto Preminger’s The Man With The Golden Arm. The music video features audio of William S Burroughssaying “bring it all down”, recorded in the studio with Ministry.

It is rumoured that the Rammstein song "Du Hast" is based on the track, or that the guitar riff in the Rammstein track was cut and sampled directly from "Just One Fix" due to the similarity in the guitar riffs of both songs, but the members of Rammstein are quoted as saying that they were simply highly influenced by Ministry.

Video
A music video for the song was produced, and is notable for featuring Beat author William S. Burroughs in both audio and video samples. This version of the song features an audio sample of Burroughs saying "Bring it all down", and a sample of Chloe Webb's line "Never trust a junkie" from the film Sid and Nancy. The video was featured in an episode of Beavis and Butt-head called "Tornado" and a tornado also appears in the video. In their commentary, Beavis was so shocked during the hematemesis scene that he declared it "beyond the limits of good taste".

Track listing

Personnel

Ministry
Al Jourgensen – vocals (1, 2), guitar, programming, production
Paul Barker – bass guitar, programming, production

Additional Personnel
Bill Rieflin – drums
Mike Scaccia – guitar
Michael Balch – programming
William S. Burroughs – spoken word (3), cover painting
Critter Newell – engineer
Paul Manno – engineer
Howie Beno – edits and programming
Jon Blumb – photography

References

External links
 .
 .

1992 songs
1993 singles
Ministry (band) songs
Sire Records singles
Warner Records singles
Songs written by Al Jourgensen
Songs written by Paul Barker
Songs written by Bill Rieflin
Songs about drugs
Songs about heroin
Song recordings produced by Al Jourgensen